The 2003–04 season was the 100th season in the existence of OGC Nice and the club's second consecutive season in the top-flight of French football. In addition to the domestic league, Nice participated in this season's editions of the Coupe de France and Coupe de la Ligue.

Players

First-team squad

Transfers

In

Out

Pre-season and friendlies

Competitions

Overview

Ligue 1

League table

Results summary

Results by round

Matches

Coupe de France

Coupe de la Ligue

Notes

References

OGC Nice seasons
Nice